The Convocation of 1563 was a significant gathering of English and Welsh clerics that consolidated the Elizabethan religious settlement, and brought the Thirty-Nine Articles close to their final form (which dates from 1571). It was, more accurately, the Convocation of 1562/3 of the province of Canterbury, beginning in January 1562 (Old Style).

Summary
Matthew Parker who was Archbishop of Canterbury had prepared documents outlining further reform in the Church of England, as had other bishops. A more thorough-going reform agenda was supported by over 30 of the participants. A compromise version, the "six articles", was narrowly defeated on a vote. The result was that the momentum for reform of the Church by its constitutional procedures was halted. Parker steered the outcome towards the via media. "Swiss-inspired reformists" were headed off.

The Convocation restored the position of the Thirty-Nine Articles in the Church of England. More accurately said, the Forty-Two Articles of Edward VI were reduced to a draft at this point, which was widely supported, and eventually enforced after 1571. There were further proposals from reformers, in particular on canon law and liturgy, some of which originated from a group among the bishops. These, however, proved contentious, and did not pass. Subsequent contestation of the same issues made some of them a matter of authority.

Collinson comments that

Moves to improve the settlement in the convocation of 1563 were led by the bishops rather than by 'Puritans' in the lower house [...]

Dawley writes that probably the surprise of the Convocation

[...] was not the amount of support given to the Precisians but the unexpected extent of loyalty to the existing regulations,

"Precisian" being the term used by Parker for his opponents on the issue of clerical dress.

Participants

Bishops
Of 20 bishops of the time (the see of Oxford being vacant), there were 12 who had left the Kingdom of England under Mary Tudor: the "Marian exiles". Of those who had remained, some had done so covertly.

Of these bishops, 19 attended at the start—not Jones, who was acting as proxy for the aged Anthony Kitchin.

Lower House
There were 27 in the Lower House of Convocation who had been émigrés of Queen Mary's time. An estimate of over 50 who had conformed in Mary's reign has also been given. Carlson argues for a definite group of 34 Puritan reformers in the Lower House.

Deans

Nicholas Wotton, Dean of Canterbury, did not attend.(ODNB)

Archdeacons

Proctors

Procedure
The Convocation was called simultaneously with a Parliament, and took place in London, in St Paul's Cathedral. Its sessions took place from 11 January to 14 April 1563 (N.S.). Robert Weston opened the Convocation on 12 January, formally, with a prorogation to the following day. The actual proceedings of Convocation opened on 13 January, when the Litany was sung, and a Latin sermon by William Day preached.

The 39 Articles, to 1571
The subsequent passage of the 39 Articles into the orthodoxy of the Church of England was tortuous. There are various versions of the Articles: manuscript from the Convocation, printed in Latin (Reyner Wolfe) and English by John Cawood and Richard Jugge (1563); printed later. A bill in the Parliament of 1566 to confirm the articles from the Convocation was halted in the House of Lords, by pressure from the Queen.

References

History of the Church of England
1560s in England
1562 in Christianity
1563 in Christianity
1562 in England
1563 in England
16th-century church councils
Protestant councils and synods